Katrin the Thrill (Katerina Panopoulou) is a singer-songwriter from Athens, Greece.

Early career

At the age of 17, she started creating music as a singer with some friends. When the band broke up she got herself an electric guitar and started writing her own songs.  In 2001, she moved to Manchester, England to study music. Two years later, she returned to Greece and teamed up with Guitarist Gina Dimakopoulou, violinist Katerina Michailidi, bassist Iakovos Siaparinas, drummer Dimitris Panagiotopoulos and formed the band Dementia Praecox. After many live performances in Greece, she broke up the band and moved to London, England to further her studies. During her stay in London, she performed live in several pubs, singing her songs unplugged.

Solo career

In 2007, under the name Katrin the Thrill, she participated in the Coca-Cola Sounwave music contest, and won a place among the best music acts. Her song If You Believe in Dreams was included in the Music on the coke side of life compilation. For the next two years she performed in Greece in various music stages and festivals, among them, Terra Vibe Park, Gagarin 205, Vrachon Theater, European Music Day, Bios, Athens Gay Pride, Festival Against Racism, Indie Free Festival and shared the stage with Electrelane, Manic Street Preachers, Greg Dulli and Chinawoman. In 2009, following the devastating fires that swept through Greece, as well as many other places around the world, the concept for Earth is calling us EP was devised, and the need to take action and help reforestation was fully realized.

Recent activity

In 2010, the Earth is calling us EP was released by Incense, as her first solo project dedicated to the earth and the environment. Her song You make me wanna die was voted for the MWR Alternative Top Charts and her EP was considered as one of the best indie rock Greek releases of the year 2010.

Discography
Earth is calling us EP (2010)

Evil Eye Charm (2012)

Compilation albums

Music on the coke side of life (2007)

www.elliniki-skini.gr (2011)

The Indie Side of Music Vol II (2014)

References

European Music Day (Retrieved: 20 July 2009)
Skintzas, George (27 February 2011) Vima newspaper
Kanelopoulos, Dimitris (20 January 2011) e-tetradio
Papanikolaou, Nikos (17 January 2011) Music Corner
Yupi.gr (Retrieved: 14 January 2011)
Lucas Vasilis interview (Retrieved: 23 February 2011)
Milatos, Makis  (24 February 2011)  Athens Voice -the podcast-
Lukas, Vasilis (6 March 2011) Espresso newspaper interview
Dailymotion.com (17 February 2010)

External links
Katrinthethrill.com – Official website
Incense: Katrin the Thrill
Livanis: Katrin the Thrill

Greek rock singers
Greek singer-songwriters
Greek rock guitarists
Indie rock musicians
Alternative rock guitarists
Alternative rock singers
Living people
Year of birth missing (living people)
Women guitarists
Musicians from Athens
Singers from Athens